Greg Saunders is a superhero appearing in American comic books published by DC Comics. He is the first DC character to bear the name Vigilante.

The character made his live-action debut in the film serial The Vigilante (1947), played by Ralph Byrd.

Publication history
Created by writer Mort Weisinger and artist Mort Meskin, Greg Saunders first appeared in Action Comics #42 (November 1941). He appeared in every issue of Action Comics until #198 (November 1954).

Fictional character biography
The original Vigilante was a western-themed hero who debuted in Action Comics #42 (November 1941): originally named Greg Sanders, the spelling was changed to Greg Saunders in the 1990s. Grandson of a Native American fighter, and the son of a sheriff in Wyoming, Saunders, as a young man, moved east to New York City and became a country singer, radio's "Prairie Troubadour". Greg returned to his home after his father was killed, bringing to justice the gang of bandits who killed him.

The Vigilante, like many heroes of the era, acquired a sidekick to aid him in his crime fighting. Stuff the Chinatown Kid was introduced in Action Comics #45. He assisted the Vigilante when a Japanese spy known as the Head framed Stuff's grandfather for provoking a Tong war.

The majority of the Vigilante's solo adventures were against non-powered, costumed criminals. He was an excellent brawler, trick shooter, sharpshooter, horseman and motorcycle rider, and an expert with the lariat. These skills gave him advantage over his adversaries in his adventures, which centered primarily in New York City.

The Vigilante fought few foes that could be considered real "super-villains". His arch-foes were the Dummy, a brilliant weapons inventor and professional killer who resembled a ventriloquist's dummy in both size and facial features, and the Rainbow Man, who committed crimes with a color motif. The Vigilante also encountered the Rattler on several occasions, as well as the Fiddler and the Shade, though the latter two villains are not the same foes that battled the Flash. Other foes included Shakes the Underworld Poet and the Dictionary, a gangster with a heightened vocabulary.

The Vigilante was also a member of the Seven Soldiers of Victory (also known as the Law's Legionnaires), one of the earliest super-hero teams (appearing in Leading Comics). In these adventures, his sidekick Stuff never appeared, being replaced by an old, somewhat crotchety man named Billy Gunn. The Vigilante was also one of the few super-hero features to survive the end of the "Golden Age" of super-hero comics, lasting as a solo feature until Action Comics #198 (1954), when he was permanently replaced by Tommy Tomorrow.

The Vigilante was revived in Bronze Age in the pages of Justice League of America, when the Seven Soldiers of Victory were brought back into active continuity. Like Green Arrow,  was a lost member of the Seven Soldiers, but he did not participate in the JLA/JSA quest to rescue them. All the members were hurled through time after defeating Nebula Man (except for Wing who was killed). The Silver Age Green Arrow, Black Canary and Johnny Thunder and Thunderbolt saved the Vigilante from a tribe of Native Americans in the Old West who felt that eventually the white men would take over their land. The Earth-1 Vigilante's contact with the League was limited to a two-part story where he aided the JLA against aliens determined to over-pollute the Earth. He remarks in his first appearance in Adventure Comics that the League did help him re-establish his career, even providing him with a new motorcycle. He later teams up with, and saves the life of Superman (his marksmanship allowed him to shoot a silver bullet at the shadow of a werewolf who, being a magical creature, was about to kill the Man of Steel). He also received a periodic feature in the pages of Adventure Comics, drawn by both Mike Sekowsky and Gray Morrow, and also in World's Finest Comics.

The short-lived series in World's Finest culminated in the Vigilante coming to Gotham City to meet his old partner Stuff, only to find his friend murdered by his old enemy, the Dummy. At the end of this series, The Vigilante rode off with Stuff's son (who had been trained by Richard Dragon).

Vigilante continued to sporadically appear as a superhero in DC Comics, having been established as running a dude ranch in Mesa City (the former home of Western hero Johnny Thunder).

Seven Soldiers

In Grant Morrison's Seven Soldiers #0, the Vigilante establishes a new Seven Soldiers of Victory to battle the monstrous spider of Miracle Mesa. He is apparently killed alongside the rest of the team, only to re-appear as a ghost in Bulleteer #3 (also part of the Seven Soldiers series). He attempts to recruit a new team of seven to further battle the threat of the Sheeda. He claims Bulleteer's actions will allow him to 'rest'.

Return
In Superman's Pal Jimmy Olsen Greg Saunders appears, alive, as the sheriff of Warpath, a town on the Mexican border formerly known for supervillain activity. Olsen's narration notes that Saunders has been dead and came back to life, but does not go into detail. Olsen also notes that Saunders appears younger, though he clearly retains all of his past experience. Saunders and a mysterious version of the hero known as the Guardian beat back a villainous invasion from Mexico.

The New 52
In 2011, "The New 52" rebooted the DC Universe. Vigilante was renamed to Greg Sanders and operated in Opal City during the mid-20th Century. Shade contacted him to help rescue his great-grandson Darnell Caldecotte from Nazi spies. Once that was done, Shade upheld his deal with Vigilante by giving him the intel on the local gangs and they parted ways.

The New Golden Age
In the pages of "The New Golden Age", Vigilante was among the Seven Soldiers of Victory who got back together when summoned by the Jill Carlyle version of the Crimson Avenger.

Powers and abilities
The Vigilante is a superb hand-to-hand combatant and martial artist, proving that he can fight not just one but many opponents combined, a brilliant marksman with his revolver which also allows him to disarm his enemies, and a master of the lariat using the lasso he manages to capture criminals and fleeing enemies. Despite having no horse, he is an infallible rider, in fact he drives his agile motorcycle. In one episode he reveals that Vigilante is an expert in aviation, in fact he is capable of flying a plane.

Enemies

Vigilante had his own rogues gallery:
 Dummy - A skilled inventor who poses as a ventriloquist's dummy. He made his debut in Leading Comics #1 being among the criminals responsible for the origin of the Seven Soldiers of Victory. He then took on Vigilante in two stories in Action Comics, took on the entire Seven Soldiers of Victory as the main villain in Leading Comics #8, and then took on Vigilante in four more issues of Action Comics. In one of these issues, he had the Lash working for him.
 Fiddler - Benjamin Bowe is a man who uses trick violins that either shot poison arrows, sprayed acid, or was loaded with TNT. He fought Vigilante in seven issues of Action Comics.
 Droop, Sailor, and Sport - A trio of henchmen working for the Fiddler. Droop was a short criminal, Sailor dressed in sailor clothes and always spoke in nautical terms, and Sport always dressed in fancy sporting clothes. They worked for the Fiddler in all the Fiddler's stories, except for Fiddler's last story, where he was instead assisted by Dictionary and Shakes.
 Head - An Asian-American criminal who poses as a spirit to other criminals.
 Killer Kelly - Vigilante's first opponent who faked his execution by electric chair.
 King - The leader of a gang who was after the gold that was found in Avalanche Junction, Wyoming.
 Lash - A whip-wielding criminal in a wheelchair, but at the end of his first story he revealed the wheelchair "was only a trick to fool the cops". Later, the Dummy hired a shadowy, whip-wielding criminal named the Lash, who may or may not have been the same character, to assist him while the Dummy was falsely pretending to go straight.
 Mr. Mungo - A criminal who caused accidents at the winter festival.
 Rainbow Man - A rainbow-themed criminal, he fought Vigilante' in 12 issues of Action Comics.<ref>Action Comics #103. DC Comics.</ref>Action Comics #119. DC Comics. Action Comics #135. DC Comics.
 Dictionary - Always a henchman who used big words in his speech. He worked for Rainbow Man along with Shakes in 4 issues of Action Comics,Action Comics #60. DC Comics.Action Comics #156. DC Comics. worked for Rainbow Man without Shakes in 4 issues of Action Comics,Action Comics #49. DC Comics.Action Comics #115. DC Comics. and worked for the Fiddler in one story along with Shakes 
 Shakes - His name short for "Shakespeare", a criminal who would rhyme all the time. In his debut story, he worked for the Lash. He then worked for Rainbow Man along with Dictionary in two stories.Action Comics #60. DC Comics. He then took on Vigilante as the sole main villain of his own story. He then worked for Rainbow Man along with Dictionary, once again took on Vigilante as the sole main villain of his own story, worked for the Fiddler along with Dictionary, again worked for Rainbow Man along with Dictionary, and finally took on Vigilante as the sole main villain of his own story.
 Scorpion - A criminal who specializes in robbing charity events.
 Shade - Keyhole Carter is a radio announcer who also works as a criminal mastermind. He fought Vigilante twice.Action Comics #44. DC Comics.

Other versions
 Two multiversal incarnations of Greg Saunders / Vigilante from Earth-1 and Earth-2 appear in Justice League of America issue #78.

In other media
Television

 Vigilante appears in Justice League Unlimited, voiced by an uncredited Michael Rosenbaum in the episode "Task Force X" and Nathan Fillion in "Hunter's Moon" and "Patriot Act". This version is a member of the Justice League.
 Vigilante appears in Batman: The Brave and the Bold, voiced by John DiMaggio.
 Vigilante appears in a picture depicted in the Stargirl episode "Brainwave" as a member of the Seven Soldiers of Victory.

Film
 Vigilante appears in a self-titled film serial, portrayed by Ralph Byrd.
 Vigilante makes a non-speaking cameo appearance in Justice League: The New Frontier''.

References

External links
 Vigilante (Greg Saunders) at the DCU Guide
 
Comic Book Profile: Vigilante (Greg Saunders)
 Comic Book Profile: Earth-1 Vigilante (Greg Saunders)
 Earth-2 Vigilante (Greg Saunders) Index

Characters created by Mort Weisinger
Comics characters introduced in 1941
DC Comics male superheroes
DC Comics titles
DC Comics Western (genre) characters
Fictional ghosts
Fictional rope fighters
Golden Age superheroes
Vigilante characters in comics
Western (genre) comics
Western (genre) gunfighters
Western (genre) heroes and heroines